The Aftermath is the third studio album released by the thrash band Bonded by Blood. It is the first to feature new vocalist Mauro Gonzales, who joined the band in 2010.

Track listing

Personnel
 Mauro Gonzalez - Vocals
 Juan Juarez - Guitar, backing vocals
 Jessie Sanchez - Bass
 Carlos Regalado - Drums

References

2012 albums
Bonded by Blood (band) albums
Albums produced by Logan Mader
Earache Records albums